Step Academy is a discipline alternative school for at-risk students in United Independent School District. Located in Laredo, Texas, United States.

It is in the former Juarez-Lincoln Elementary School.

References

External links
 

United Independent School District
Schools in Laredo, Texas
Public high schools in Texas
Alternative schools in the United States